Vivente rege (Latin: "with the king (still) living") is a form of king's election, where the king's successor, usually of the same dynasty, was elected before the old king died. It was an important element of politics in Poland during the times of the nobility's election of kings, when monarchs would attempt to push through the election of their heir, and Polish nobility (szlachta) would oppose it, on the grounds that it would lead to absolute monarchy.

References

Latin political words and phrases
Polish–Lithuanian Commonwealth